Finney Creek is a stream in Saline County in the U.S. state of Missouri. It is a tributary of the Blackwater River.

The namesake of Finney Creek is unknown.

See also
List of rivers of Missouri

References

Rivers of Saline County, Missouri
Rivers of Missouri